Haruna Babangida (born 1 October 1982) is a Nigerian former professional footballer who played as a winger.

Babangida is the eighth of ten brothers; he is the younger brother of Tijani Babangida and Ibrahim Babangida.

Club career

Early career
Born in Kaduna, Haruna Babangida started his youth career at Shooting Stars, before signing for Ajax at the age of 13. He was snapped up by Barcelona a year later. In 1998, aged 15, Babangida made his first-team debut for the Catalan club in a pre-season friendly against AGOVV Apeldoorn, becoming the second youngest ever player to feature for Barcelona. However, he did not make the breakthrough and in 2002–03 was loaned to second division side Terrassa, before spending the following season playing for Barcelona B and Cádiz (in the second half).

Metalurh Donetsk then took him to Ukraine on a permanent basis.

Greece and Cyprus
In 2005, Olympiacos signed Babangida on a three-year contract after he impressed in a pre-season tournament in Spain.

In the first season, he played 25 league appearances and started 11 times for the double-winners. He rarely scored, but scored his first UEFA Champions League goal at home against Lyon, in the third minute, but the match ended as a 1–4 loss.

On 25 May 2007, Olympiacos officially released Haruna Babangida.

He made his debut for Apollon Limassol on 1 September 2007 against rival team AEL Limassol, where he scored two goals in an eventual 4–3 win.

Mainz 05
On 14 June 2010, he signed a one-year contract for Mainz 05 with an option to extend the contract for two more years.
On 26 June 2010, he scored his first goal against Panathinaikos. The half season that was less than successful for Babangida, with only a single appearance in the Bundesliga. In December of that year, Mainz released him.

Vitesse
On 12 January 2011, he joined Vitesse as a testplayer and on 16 January he signed a contract until the end of the season.

International career
He made his debut for Nigeria on 20 August 2003, in a friendly match which Nigeria lost 0–3 to Japan in Tokyo.

Club statistics
Source:

Honours

Olympiacos
Greek Championship: 2005–2006, 2006–2007

References

External links
 
 
 cadistas1910.com profile  
 

1982 births
Living people
Sportspeople from Kaduna
Association football wingers
Nigerian footballers
Nigeria international footballers
Nigeria under-20 international footballers
Nigerian expatriate footballers
Super League Greece players
Olympiacos F.C. players
Segunda División players
FC Barcelona Atlètic players
Cádiz CF players
Terrassa FC footballers
Ukrainian Premier League players
FC Metalurh Donetsk players
Cypriot First Division players
Apollon Limassol FC players
Russian Premier League players
FC Kuban Krasnodar players
Bundesliga players
1. FSV Mainz 05 II players
1. FSV Mainz 05 players
Eredivisie players
SBV Vitesse players
Austrian Football Bundesliga players
Kapfenberger SV players
Mosta F.C. players
Expatriate footballers in Cyprus
Nigerian expatriate sportspeople in Russia
Expatriate footballers in Greece
Nigerian expatriate sportspeople in Greece
Expatriate footballers in Ukraine
Nigerian expatriate sportspeople in Ukraine
Expatriate footballers in Russia
Expatriate footballers in Germany
Nigerian expatriate sportspeople in Germany
Expatriate footballers in the Netherlands
Nigerian expatriate sportspeople in the Netherlands
Expatriate footballers in Austria
Expatriate footballers in Malta
Babangida brothers